Toivo Hjalmar Långström (1889, Helsinki - 1983) was a Finnish politician and trade union activist. He was the last leader of Socialist Workers' Party of Finland from May to August 1923 before the party was banned and its leadership imprisoned. Långström was in jail at the Tammisaari prison camp for political reasons between 1930 and 1934 and during Finland's 1941-1944 Continuation War against the Soviet Union, Långström was also active in the Communist Party of Finland and (later) the Finnish People's Democratic League.

Långström was elected to the Parliament of Finland in the 1922 election.

1889 births
1983 deaths
Politicians from Helsinki
People from Uusimaa Province (Grand Duchy of Finland)
Socialist Workers Party of Finland politicians
Communist Party of Finland politicians
Finnish People's Democratic League politicians
Members of the Parliament of Finland (1922–24)
Finnish prisoners and detainees